Paraphlepsius is a genus of leafhoppers in the family Cicadellidae. Paraphlepsius is in the tribe Pendarini within the subfamily Deltocephalinae. There are around 70 described species in Paraphlepsius.

Species
These 73 species belong to the genus Paraphlepsius:

 Paraphlepsius abruptus DeLong 1938 c g
 Paraphlepsius acutus Crowder 1952 c g
 Paraphlepsius altus Osborn & Ball 1897 c g
 Paraphlepsius apertinus Osborn & Lathrop 1923 c g
 Paraphlepsius apertus (Van Duzee, 1892) c g b
 Paraphlepsius attractus Ball 1909 c g
 Paraphlepsius bifidus Sanders & DeLong, 1917 c g b
 Paraphlepsius blockeri Cwikla 1980 c g
 Paraphlepsius brunneus DeLong 1916 c g
 Paraphlepsius carolinus Lathrop 1917 c g
 Paraphlepsius certus DeLong 1938 c g
 Paraphlepsius chepada DeLong 1982 c g
 Paraphlepsius cinereus Van Duzee 1892 c g
 Paraphlepsius collitus (Ball, 1903) c g b
 Paraphlepsius continuus (DeLong, 1938) c g b
 Paraphlepsius cornutus Crowder 1952 c g
 Paraphlepsius delongi Hamilton 1975 c g
 Paraphlepsius dentatus Baker, 1898 c g b
 Paraphlepsius divergens Oman 1931 c g
 Paraphlepsius docilis Van Duzee 1923 c g
 Paraphlepsius eburneolus Osborn & Lathrop, 1923 c g b
 Paraphlepsius electus DeLong 1938 c g
 Paraphlepsius emarginatus Crowder 1952 c g
 Paraphlepsius excavatus Crowder 1952 c g
 Paraphlepsius exilis Hamilton 1975 c g
 Paraphlepsius floridanus Ball 1909 c g
 Paraphlepsius fulvidorsum (Fitch, 1851) c g b
 Paraphlepsius fuscipennis Van Duzee 1892 c g
 Paraphlepsius geneticus Hamilton 1975 c g
 Paraphlepsius hemicolor Sanders & DeLong 1923 c g
 Paraphlepsius humidus Van Duzee 1892 c g
 Paraphlepsius incisus Van Duzee 1892 c g
 Paraphlepsius irroratus (Say, 1830) c g b (bespeckled leafhopper)
 Paraphlepsius lascivius (Ball, 1900) c g b
 Paraphlepsius latifrons Van Duzee 1892 c g
 Paraphlepsius lobatus Osborn 1898 c g
 Paraphlepsius lupalus Hamilton 1975 c g
 Paraphlepsius luxuria Hamilton 1975 c g
 Paraphlepsius maculellus Osborn 1915 c g
 Paraphlepsius maculosus Osborn 1923 c g
 Paraphlepsius micronotatus Osborn & Lathrop, 1923 c g b
 Paraphlepsius mimus Baker 1898 c g
 Paraphlepsius nebulosus Van Duzee 1892 c g
 Paraphlepsius obvius Oman 1931 c g
 Paraphlepsius occidentalis Baker 1898 c g
 Paraphlepsius operculatus Ball 1927 c g
 Paraphlepsius orthana DeLong & Linnavuori 1978 c g
 Paraphlepsius pallidus Van Duzee 1892 c g
 Paraphlepsius particolor Sanders & DeLong 1920 c g
 Paraphlepsius planus Sanders & DeLong 1922 c g
 Paraphlepsius pusillus Baker 1898 c g
 Paraphlepsius quadratus Hamilton 1975 c g
 Paraphlepsius rileyi Baker 1898 c g
 Paraphlepsius rossi DeLong, 1938 c g b
 Paraphlepsius siclus DeLong 1938 c g
 Paraphlepsius solidaginis Walker, 1851 c g b
 Paraphlepsius spinosus Crowder 1952 c g
 Paraphlepsius strobi Fitch 1851 c g
 Paraphlepsius superior Hamilton 1975 c g
 Paraphlepsius supinus DeLong 1938 c g
 Paraphlepsius tennessa DeLong 1916 c g
 Paraphlepsius tennessus b
 Paraphlepsius texanus Baker, 1898 c g b (Texas prairie leafhopper)
 Paraphlepsius tigrinus Ball 1909 c g
 Paraphlepsius torridus Lathrop 1917 c g
 Paraphlepsius truncatus Van Duzee 1892 c g
 Paraphlepsius tubus Ball 1909 c g
 Paraphlepsius turpiculus Ball 1900 c g
 Paraphlepsius umbellatus Hamilton 1975 c g
 Paraphlepsius umbrosus Sanders & DeLong 1917 c g
 Paraphlepsius varispinus Hamilton, 1972 c g b
 Paraphlepsius ventosus DeLong 1944 c g
 Paraphlepsius zanclois Hamilton 1975 c g

Data sources: i = ITIS, c = Catalogue of Life, g = GBIF, b = Bugguide.net

References

Further reading

External links

 

Cicadellidae genera
Pendarini